Fritz Fischer may refer to:

 Fritz Fischer (1908–1999), German historian
 Fritz Fischer (medical doctor) (1912–2003), Waffen-SS doctor
 Fritz Fischer (biathlete) (born 1956), German biathlete
 Fritz Fischer (physicist) (1898–1947), Swiss physicist